Shag River is a river on Resolution Island in Fiordland, New Zealand. It rises north west of Mount Roa and flows south into the Taumoana (Five Fingers Peninsula) Marine Reserve, part of  Tamatea / Dusky Sound.

See also
List of rivers of New Zealand

References

Rivers of Fiordland